The women's giant slalom at the 2017 Asian Winter Games was held on 23 February 2017 at the Sapporo Teine, Japan.

Schedule
All times are Japan Standard Time (UTC+09:00)

Results
Legend
DNF — Did not finish
DSQ — Disqualified

 Kang Young-seo was awarded bronze because of no three-medal sweep per country rule.

References

Results

External links
Official website

Women giant slalom